Maurice Kleman (alternate spelling Kléman; 11 August 1934 – 29 January 2021) was a French physicist involved in experimental and theoretical studies of the physics of defects; he has covered various fields of research, from condensed matter to heliophysics. As an author, he has been collected by libraries worldwide.

Early life
Kleman was born in Paris in a family of Jewish origin which was saved from the Nazi persecutions during the Second World War by the inhabitants of the village of Le Chambon-sur-Lignon, Haute-Loire, as many other refugees were; this village is collectively honored as Righteous Among the Nations.

Education 
Ecole Polytechnique and Ecole des Mines de Paris; PhD under J. Friedel’s supervision on ferromagnetic thin films, at the French Iron and Steel Institute (IRSID). Postdoc at the University of Oxford.

Career 
Kleman belonged to the Centre National de la Recherche Scientifique (CNRS) since 1969, first as a member of the Laboratoire de Physique des Solides (LPS) in Orsay (1969-1993), which he headed from 1982 to 1984, then of the Laboratoire de Minéralogie et de Cristallographie de Paris (LMCP). He joined the Institut de Physique du Globe de Paris (IPGP) in 2010 and has been visiting professor at the Ecole polytechnique fédérale de Lausanne and at the Massachusetts Institute of Technology (MIT).

Research 
Kleman’s research covers many domains, in materials science (liquid crystals, quasicrystals, magnetic systems, amorphous media), more recently in heliophysics (magnetic flux ropes). In all these domains his interests are concerned with the concept of defect, in the continuation of F.C. Frank and J. Friedel. He demonstrated the role of curved crystal defects in the topology of frustrated systems. He developed with J. Friedel the concepts of continuous defects. He showed that interplanetary magnetic flux ropes can be understood as extended singularities of the vector potential.

Awards 
 1975: Médaille d'argent du CNRS
 1980: Prix de Physique Jean Ricard de la Société Française de Physique
 2007: Grand Prix de l’Académie des Sciences (prix du CEA)
 2018: International Honorary Member of the American Academy of Arts and Sciences.

Books

References

1934 births
2021 deaths
20th-century French Jews
21st-century French Jews
École Polytechnique alumni
Mines Paris - PSL alumni
French physicists
French science writers
Writers from Paris